The TGV ("high-speed train"; previously ) is France's intercity high-speed rail service, operated by SNCF. SNCF worked on a high-speed rail network from 1966 to 1974 and presented the project to President Georges Pompidou who approved it. Originally designed as turbotrains to be powered by gas turbines, TGV prototypes evolved into electric trains with the 1973 oil crisis. In 1976 the SNCF ordered 87 high-speed trains from Alstom. Following the inaugural service between Paris and Lyon in 1981 on the LGV Sud-Est (LGV for Ligne à Grande Vitesse; "high-speed line"), the network, centered on Paris, has expanded to connect major cities across France (including Marseille, Lille, Bordeaux, Strasbourg, Rennes and Montpellier) and in neighbouring countries on a combination of high-speed and conventional lines. The TGV network in France carries about 110 million passengers a year.

The high-speed tracks, maintained by SNCF Réseau, are subject to heavy regulation. Confronted with the fact that train drivers would not be able to see signals along the track-side when trains reach full speed, engineers developed the TVM cab-signalling technology, which would later also see use on limited routes within Belgium, the UK, and Korea. It allows for a train engaging in an emergency braking to request within seconds all following trains to reduce their speed; if a driver does not react within , the system overrides the controls and reduces the train's speed automatically. The TVM safety mechanism enables TGVs using the same line to depart every three minutes.

A TGV test train set the world record for the fastest wheeled train, reaching  on 3 April 2007.

The TGV was conceived at the same period as other technological projects sponsored by the Government of France, including the Ariane 1 rocket and Concorde supersonic airliner; those funding programmes were known as champion national policies (literal translation: national champion). The commercial success of the first high-speed line led to a rapid development of services to the south (LGV Rhône-Alpes, LGV Méditerranée, LGV Nîmes–Montpellier), west (LGV Atlantique, LGV Bretagne-Pays de la Loire, LGV Sud Europe Atlantique), north (LGV Nord, LGV Interconnexion Est) and east (LGV Rhin-Rhône, LGV Est). Neighbouring countries Italy, Spain and Germany developed their own high-speed rail services.

The TGV system itself extends to neighbouring countries, either directly (Italy, Spain, Belgium, Luxembourg and Germany) or through TGV-derivative networks linking France to Switzerland (Lyria), to Belgium, Germany and the Netherlands (Thalys), as well as to the United Kingdom (Eurostar). Several future lines are planned, including extensions within France and to surrounding countries. Cities such as Tours and Le Mans have become part of a "TGV commuter belt" around Paris; the TGV also serves Charles de Gaulle Airport and Lyon–Saint-Exupéry Airport. A visitor attraction in itself, it stops at Disneyland Paris and in tourist cities such as Avignon and Aix-en-Provence as well. Brest, Chambéry, Nice, Toulouse and Biarritz are reachable by TGVs running on a mix of LGVs and modernised lines. In 2007, SNCF generated profits of €1.1 billion (approximately US$1.75 billion, £875 million) driven largely by higher margins on the TGV network.

History

The idea of the TGV was first proposed in the 1960s, after Japan had begun construction of the Shinkansen (also known as the "bullet train") in 1959. At the time the Government of France favoured new technology, exploring the production of hovercraft and the Aérotrain air-cushion vehicle. Simultaneously, the SNCF began researching high-speed trains on conventional tracks. In 1976, the administration agreed to fund the first line. By the mid-1990s, the trains were so popular that SNCF President Louis Gallois declared that the TGV was "the train that saved French railways".

Development

The first prototype, TGV 001, was the only gas-turbine TGV:  following the increase in the price of oil during the 1973 energy crisis, gas turbines were deemed uneconomic and the project turned to electricity from overhead lines, generated by new nuclear power stations.

TGV 001 was not a wasted prototype: its gas turbine was only one of its many new technologies for high-speed rail travel. It also tested high-speed brakes, needed to dissipate the large amount of kinetic energy of a train at high speed, high-speed aerodynamics, and signalling. It was articulated, comprising two adjacent carriages sharing a bogie, allowing free yet controlled motion with respect to one another. It reached , which remains the world speed record for a non-electric train. Its interior and exterior were styled by French designer Jacques Cooper, whose work formed the basis of early TGV designs, including the distinctive nose shape of the first power cars.

Changing the TGV to electric traction required a significant design overhaul. The first electric prototype, nicknamed Zébulon, was completed in 1974, testing features such as innovative body mounting of motors, pantographs, suspension and braking. Body mounting of motors allowed over 3 tonnes to be eliminated from the power cars and greatly reduced the unsprung weight. The prototype travelled almost  during testing.

In 1976, the French administration funded the TGV project, and construction of the LGV Sud-Est, the first high-speed line, began shortly afterwards. The line was given the designation LN1,  ("New Line 1"). After two pre-production trainsets (nicknamed Patrick and Sophie) had been tested and substantially modified, the first production version was delivered on 25 April 1980.

Service

The TGV opened to the public between Paris and Lyon on 27 September 1981. Contrary to its earlier fast services, SNCF intended TGV service for all types of passengers, with the same initial ticket price as trains on the parallel conventional line. To counteract the popular misconception that the TGV would be a premium service for business travellers, SNCF started a major publicity campaign focusing on the speed, frequency, reservation policy, normal price, and broad accessibility of the service. This commitment to a democratised TGV service was enhanced in the Mitterrand era with the promotional slogan "Progress means nothing unless it is shared by all". The TGV was considerably faster (in terms of door to door travel time) than normal trains, cars, or aeroplanes. The trains became widely popular, the public welcoming fast and practical travel.

The Eurostar service began operation in 1994, connecting continental Europe to London via the Channel Tunnel and the LGV Nord-Europe with a version of the TGV designed for use in the tunnel and the United Kingdom. The first phase of the British High Speed 1 line was completed in 2003, the second phase in November 2007. The fastest trains take 2 hours 15 minutes London–Paris and 1 hour 51 minutes London–Brussels. The first twice-daily London-Amsterdam service ran 3 April 2018, and took 3 hours 47 minutes.

Milestones

The TGV was the world's third commercial and standard gauge high-speed train service, after Japan's Shinkansen, which connected Tokyo and Osaka from 1 October 1964, and Britain's InterCity 125 on main lines such as the East Coast Main Line, which entered service in 1976.

A modified TGV test train holds the world speed record for conventional trains. On 3 April 2007 a modified TGV POS train reached  under test conditions on the LGV Est between Paris and Strasbourg. The line voltage was boosted to 31 kV, and extra ballast was tamped onto the permanent way. The test was part of an extensive research programme by Alstom.

A Eurostar (TGV) train broke the record for the longest non-stop high-speed international journey on 17 May 2006 carrying the cast and filmmakers of The Da Vinci Code from London to Cannes for the Cannes Film Festival.

Passenger usage
On 28 November 2003, the TGV network carried its one billionth passenger, a distant second only to the Shinkansen's five billionth passenger in 2000.

Excluding international traffic, the TGV system carried 98 million passengers during 2008, an increase of 8 million (9.1%) on the previous year.

Lines in operation 

The current lines and those under construction can be grouped into four routes radiating from Paris and one that currently only connects to Paris through a section of classical track:
LGV Interconnexion Est connects LGV Sud-Est to LGV Nord around Paris.

Existing lines
 LGV Rhône-Alpes (Lyon to Valence) (opened 1992)
 LGV Interconnexion Est (LGV Sud-Est to LGV Nord Europe, east of Paris) (opened 1994)
 LGV Méditerranée (An extension of LGV Rhône-Alpes: Valence to Marseille-Saint-Charles) with a branch to Nîmes (opened 2001)
 LGV Perpignan–Figueres (Spain to France) (construction finished 17 February 2009, TGV service from 19 December 2010)
 LGV Rhin-Rhône (Lyon–Dijon–Mulhouse), first phase opened 11 December 2011.
 LGV Sud Europe Atlantique (Tours–Bordeaux), extending the southern branch of the LGV Atlantique (also called LGV Sud-Ouest); opened on 2 July 2017.
 LGV Bretagne-Pays de la Loire (Le Mans–Rennes), extending the western branch of the LGV Atlantique; opened on 2 July 2017.
 Nîmes-Montpellier bypass extending the south-western stub of the LGV Méditerranée by  towards the Spanish border; opened on 12 December 2017 for freight (July 2018 for passengers).

Under construction 
 Lyon–Turin (Lyon–Chambéry–Turin), connecting to the Italian TAV network.

Planned lines
In 2017, French President Emmanuel Macron announced a plan to "reassess" planned LGV construction, implying that many of the projects listed here will be delayed or not constructed at all. Contrary to this, the French government confirmed 5 new lines in late summer 2018.

LGV Bordeaux–Toulouse
LGV Montpellier–Perpignan, the last gap in Europe's longest high-speed route between Paris and Málaga/Seville.
LGV Poitiers–Limoges
LGV Provence-Alpes-Côte d'Azur (Marseille–Nice), would reduce Paris–Nice travel times from 5h25 to 3h50.
LGV Sud Europe Atlantique Phase 3 (Bordeaux to Spanish Border)
 LGV Rhin-Rhône (Lyon–Dijon–Mulhouse), second phase of the eastern branch construction initially planned to start in 2014, but funding is unclear for the western and southern branches.
 Extension to Narbonne of the LGV Bordeaux–Toulouse
 LGV Picardie (Paris–Amiens–Calais), cutting off the corner of the LGV Nord-Europe via Lille.
 LGV Normandie would run from Paris to Rouen, Le Havre, Caen and Cherbourg. The line would have a stop in La Défense where it would meet with a proposed link to LGV Nord and a proposed Eurostar service to terminate in La Défense.
  On 30 July 2010, the government of then President Sarkozy announced that it expected to start work on a second LGV between Paris and Lyon between 2020 and 2030. The route will be known as LGV POCL (Paris, Orléans, Clermont-Ferrand and Lyon). Four potential routes are being studied as of 2011, with consultations continuing into 2012. Work would not start before 2025.

Rolling stock 
TGVs have semi-permanently coupled articulated un-powered coaches, with Jacobs bogies between the coaches supporting both of them. Power cars at each end of the trains have their own bogies. Trains can be lengthened by coupling two TGVs, using couplers hidden in the noses of the power cars. The articulated design is advantageous during a derailment, as the passenger carriages are more likely to stay upright and in line with the track. Normal trains could split at couplings and jackknife, as seen in the Eschede train disaster. A disadvantage is that it is difficult to split sets of carriages. While power cars can be removed from trains by standard uncoupling procedures, specialised depot equipment is needed to split carriages, by lifting the entire train at once. Once uncoupled, one of the carriage ends is left without a bogie at the split, so a bogie frame is required to support it. Using Power Cars instead of Electric Multiple Units easily allows for a high ride quality and less electrical equipment.

There are five types of TGV equipment in use, all built by Alstom:
 TGV Atlantique (10 carriages)
 TGV Réseau (similar to Atlantique, but 8 carriages)
 TGV Duplex (two floors for greater passenger capacity)
 TGV POS (originally for routes to Germany, now used to Switzerland)
TGV 2N2 (Avelia Euroduplex) (upgrade of the TGV Duplex)

Retired sets:
 TGV Sud-Est (retired in December 2019)
TGV La Poste (retired in June 2015)

Future sets:
 Avelia Horizon (Entry into service in 2023)

Several TGV types have broken records, including the V150 and TGV 001. V150 was a specially modified five-car double-deck trainset that reached  under controlled conditions on a test run. The record-breaking speed is impractical for commercial trains due to motor overcharging, empty train weight, rail and engine wear issues, elimination of all but three coaches, excessive vibration, noise and lack of emergency stopping methods.

All are at least bi-current, which means that they can operate at 25 kV, 50 Hz AC (including LGVs) and at 1.5 kV DC (such as the 1.5 kV lignes classiques south of Paris). Trains to Germany, Switzerland, Belgium and the Netherlands must accommodate other voltages, requiring tri-current and quadri-current TGVs. TGVs have two pairs of pantographs, two for AC use and two for DC. When passing between areas of different supply voltage, marker boards remind the driver to turn off power, lower the pantograph(s), adjust a switch to select the appropriate system, and raise the pantograph(s). Pantographs and pantograph height control are selected automatically based on the voltage system chosen by the driver. Once the train detects the correct supply, a dashboard indicator illuminates and the driver can switch on the traction motors. The train coasts across the boundary between sections.

TGV Sud-Est

The Sud-Est fleet was built between 1978 and 1988 and operated the first TGV service, from Paris to Lyon in 1981. There were 107 passenger sets, of which nine are tri-current (including 15 kV,  Hz AC for use in Switzerland) and the rest bi-current. There were seven bi-current half-sets without seats that carried mail for La Poste between Paris, Lyon and Provence, in a distinctive yellow livery until they were phased out in 2015.

Each set were made up of two power cars and eight carriages (capacity 345 seats), including a powered bogie in the carriages adjacent to the power cars. They weigh 385 tonnes with a power output of 6,450 kW under 25 kV.

The sets were built to run at  but most were upgraded to  during mid-life refurbishment in preparation for the opening of the LGV Méditerranée. The few sets that still have a maximum speed of  operate on routes that include a comparatively short distance on LGV, such as to Switzerland via Dijon; SNCF did not consider it financially worthwhile to upgrade their speed for a marginal reduction in journey time.

In December 2019, the trains were phased out from service. In late 2019 and early 2020, TGV 01 (Nicknamed Patrick), which was the very first TGV train, did a farewell service that included all three liveries that were worn during their service.

TGV Atlantique

The 105-strong bi-current Atlantique fleet was built between 1988 and 1992 for the opening of the LGV Atlantique and entry into service began in 1989. They weigh 444 tonnes, and are made up of two power cars and ten carriages with a capacity of 485 seats. The efficiency of the Atlantique with all seats filled has been calculated at 767 PMPG, though with a typical occupancy of 60% it is about 460 PMPG (a Toyota Prius with three passengers is 144 PMPG).

Modified unit 325 set the world speed record in 1990 on the LGV before its opening. The set was reduced to two power cars and three carriages to improve the power-to-weight ratio, weighing 250 tonnes. Three carriages, including the bar carriage in the centre, is the minimum possible configuration because of the articulation.

TGV Réseau

The first Réseau (Network) sets entered service in 1993. Fifty bi-current sets were ordered in 1990, supplemented by 40 tri-current sets in 1992/1993. Ten tri-current sets carry the Thalys livery and are known as Thalys PBA (Paris-Brussels-Amsterdam) sets. As well as using standard French voltages, the tri-current sets can operate under the Netherlands' 1.5 kV and Italian and Belgian 3 kV DC supplies.

They are formed of two power cars (8,800 kW under 25 kV – as TGV Atlantique) and eight carriages, giving a capacity of 377 seats. The bi-current sets weigh 383 tonnes: owing to axle-load restrictions in Belgium the tri-current sets have a series of modifications, such as the replacement of steel with aluminium and hollow axles, to reduce the weight to under 17 t per axle.

Owing to early complaints of uncomfortable pressure changes when entering tunnels at high speed on the LGV Atlantique, the Réseau sets are now pressure-sealed. They can be coupled to a Duplex set.

TGV Duplex

The Duplex was built to increase TGV capacity without increasing train length or the number of trains. Each carriage has two levels, with access doors at the lower level taking advantage of low French platforms. A staircase gives access to the upper level, where the gangway between carriages is located. There are 512 seats per set. On busy routes such as Paris-Marseille they are operated in pairs, providing 1,024 seats in two Duplex sets or 800 in a Duplex set plus a Reseau set. Each set has a wheelchair accessible compartment.

After a lengthy development process starting in 1988 (during which they were known as the TGV-2N) the original batch of 30 was built between 1995 and 1998. Further deliveries started in 2000 with the Duplex fleet now totalling 160 units, making it the backbone of the SNCF TGV-fleet. Extensive use of aluminium means that they weigh not much more than the TGV Réseau sets they supplement.

Duplex TGVs are now operating on all of the French high speed lines.

TGV POS

TGV POS (Paris-Ostfrankreich-Süddeutschland or Paris-Eastern France-Southern Germany) are used on the LGV Est.

Unlike TGV-A, TGV-R and TGV-D, they have asynchronous motors, and isolation of an individual motor is possible in case of failure.

Avelia Euroduplex (TGV 2N2)

The bi-current TGV 2N2 (Avelia Euroduplex) can be regarded as the 3rd generation of Duplex. The series was commissioned from December 2011 for links to Germany and Switzerland (tri-current trains) and to cope with the increased traffic due to the opening of the LGV Rhine-Rhone.

ERTMS makes them compatible to allow access to Spain similar to Dasye.

TGV technology outside France
TGV technology has been adopted in a number of other countries:
 AVE (Alta Velocidad Española), in Spain.
 Thalys in Belgium, the Netherlands and Germany.
 Korea Train Express (KTX), in South Korea.
 British Rail Class 373 operate Eurostar services between the United Kingdom, France, Belgium.
 Acela Express, a high-speed tilting train built by Alstom and Bombardier for the Northeast Corridor in the United States. The Acela uses several TGV technologies including the motors, electrical/drivetrain system (rectifiers, inverters, regenerative braking technology), truck structure and disc brakes, and crash energy management technology to control structural deformations in accidents. However, the Acela's tilting, non-articulated carriages are derived from the Bombardier's Canadian LRC trains and are custom built for U.S. Federal Railroad Administration crash standards.
 Avelia Liberty, the replacement for the Acela Express in the United States. Expected to enter service in 2023.
 The Moroccan government agreed to a €2 billion contract for Alstom to build Al-Boraq, an LGV between Tangier and Casablanca which opened in 2018.
Italian open-access high-speed operator Nuovo Trasporto Viaggiatori has signed up with Alstom to purchase 25 AGV 11-car sets (TGV 4th generation, running at ) for delivery starting in 2009.

Future TGVs
SNCF and Alstom are investigating new technology that could be used for high-speed transport.
The development of TGV trains is being pursued in the form of the Automotrice à grande vitesse (AGV) high-speed multiple unit with motors under each carriage. Investigations are being carried out with the aim of producing trains at the same cost as TGVs with the same safety standards. AGVs of the same length as TGVs could have up to 450 seats. The prototype AGV was unveiled by Alstom on 5 February 2008.

Italian operator NTV is the first customer for the AGV, and became the first open-access high-speed rail operator in Europe, starting operation in 2011.

The design process of the next generation of TGVs began in 2016 when SNCF and Alstom signed an agreement to jointly develop the trainsets, with goals of reducing purchase and operating costs, as well as improved interior design.

TGV M 

The design that emerged from the process was named TGV M, and in July 2018 SNCF ordered 100 trainsets with deliveries expected to begin in 2024. They are expected to cost €25 million per 8-car set.

Accidents

In almost three decades of high-speed operation, the TGV has not recorded a single passenger fatality due to accidents while running at high speed on normal passenger service. There have been several accidents, including four derailments at or above , but in only one of these—a test run on a new line—did carriages overturn. This is credited in part to the stiffness that the articulated design lends to the train. There have been fatal accidents involving TGVs on lignes classiques, where the trains are exposed to the same dangers as normal trains, such as level crossings. These include one terrorist bombing, which could as well have occurred at high speed as not.

On LGVs
A previous emergency stop had caused a wheel flat; the bogie concerned derailed while crossing the points at the entrance to the station. No one on the train was injured, but 25 passengers waiting on the platform for another TGV were slightly injured by ballast that was thrown up from the trackbed.
Rain had caused a hole to open up under the track; the hole dated from the First World War but had not been detected during construction. The front power car and four carriages derailed but remained aligned with the track. Of the 200 passengers, one was slightly injured.
The transmission assembly on the rear bogie of the front power car failed, with parts falling onto the track. Four bogies out of 24 derailed. Out of 501 passengers, seven were bruised and others treated for shock.
 14 November 2015: TGV 2369 was involved in the Eckwersheim derailment, near Strasbourg, while being tested on the then-unopened second phase of the LGV Est.  The derailment resulted in 11 deaths among those aboard, while 11 others aboard the train were seriously injured. Excessive speed has been cited as the cause.

On classic lines
 31 December 1983: A bomb allegedly planted by the terrorist organisation of Carlos the Jackal exploded on board a TGV from Marseille to Paris; two people were killed.
28 September 1988: TGV 736, operated by set 70 "Melun", collided with a lorry carrying an electric transformer weighing 100 tonnes that had become stuck on a level crossing in Voiron, Isère. The vehicle had not obtained the required crossing permit from the French Direction départementale de l'équipement. The weight of the lorry caused a very violent collision; the train driver and a passenger died, and 25 passengers were slightly injured.
 4 January 1991: after a brake failure, TGV 360 ran away from Châtillon depot. No one was injured. The leading power car and the first two carriages were severely damaged, and were rebuilt.
The power car spun round and fell down an embankment. The front two carriages left the track and came to a stop in woods beside the track. Seven people were injured.
 31 October 2001: TGV 8515 from Paris to Irun derailed at  near Dax in southwest France. All ten carriages derailed and the rear power unit fell over. The cause was a broken rail.
The front power car was severely damaged, but only one bogie derailed. Only the driver was slightly injured.
The driver of the truck died; on the train, one person was seriously injured and 24 were slightly injured.
 17 July 2014: a TER train ran into the rear of a TGV at Denguin, Pyrénées-Atlantiques. Forty people were injured.

Following the number of accidents at level crossings, an effort has been made to remove all level crossings on lignes classiques used by TGVs. The ligne classique from Tours to Bordeaux at the end of the LGV Atlantique has no level crossings as a result.

Protests against the TGV
The first environmental protests against the building of an LGV occurred in May 1990 during the planning stages of the LGV Méditerranée. Protesters blocked a railway viaduct to protest against the planned route, arguing that it was unnecessary, and that trains could keep using existing lines to reach Marseille from Lyon.

The Turin–Lyon high-speed railway (Lyon-Chambéry-Turin), which would connect the TGV network to the Italian TAV network, has been the subject of demonstrations in Italy. While most Italian political parties agree on the construction of this line, some inhabitants of the towns where construction would take place oppose it vehemently. The concerns put forward by the protesters centre on storage of dangerous materials mined during tunnel boring, like asbestos and perhaps uranium, in the open air. This health danger could be avoided by using more expensive techniques for handling radioactive materials. A six-month delay in the start of construction has been decided in order to study solutions. In addition to the concerns of the residents, RFB – a ten-year-old national movement – opposes the development of Italy's TAV high-speed rail network as a whole.

General complaints about the noise of TGVs passing near towns and villages have led the SNCF to build acoustic fencing along large sections of LGV to reduce the disturbance to residents, but protests still take place where SNCF has not addressed the issue.

Mail services
In addition to its standard services, mail delivery services were also operated by TGVs.

For many years, a service termed SNCF TGV La Poste transported mail for the French mail service, La Poste. It used windowless but otherwise standard TGV rolling stock, painted in the yellow and blue livery of La Poste. However, the service ceased in June 2015.

Mobile hospital service
During the COVID-19 pandemic, several TGV trains were transformed into mobile hospitals, in order to transport critically ill patients from overwhelmed hospitals in the East of France to hospitals in the west.

Every coach allows for up to 6 patients, allowing for the transport of several dozen patients, attended by a staff of 50 medical workers. Although the train moves at high speed, it accelerates and decelerates smoothly, allowing for medical procedures to be performed during transport.

Rebranding
Since July 2017, TGV services are gradually being rebranded as TGV inOui and Ouigo in preparation for the opening of the French HSR market to competition.

TGV inOui 

TGV inOui is SNCF's premium high-speed rail service. The name inOui was chosen because it sounds like the French word inouï meaning "extraordinary" (or more literally, "unheard of").

Ouigo 

Ouigo is SNCF's low-cost high-speed rail service. Trains have a high-density one-class configuration and reduced on-board services. The services traditionally operate from less busy secondary stations, sometimes outside of the city centre. The literal translation of the brand name is "yes go", but the name is also a play on the English homonym, "we go".

See also

 iDTGV
 High-speed rail in France
 TER-GV – TGVs operating on relatively short distances along the LGV Nord
 TGV track construction
 TGV world speed record – overview and chronology of speed record attempts
 V150 (train)
 AVE
 YHT
 Intercity-Express

Notes and references

Further reading

Cinotti, Eric and Tréboul, Jean-Baptiste (2000) Les TGV européens : Eurostar, Thalys, Paris : Presses universitaires de France,  (in French)
Perren, Brian (2000) TGV handbook, 2nd ed., Harrow Weald : Capital Transport, 

Soulié, Claude and Tricoire, Jean (2002). Le grand livre du TGV, Paris: La Vie du Rail,

External links

Official SNCF Website (in English)
Official TGV Website (in English)

 
SNCF brands
High-speed rail in France
High-speed trains
SNCF
Rail transport in Europe
Eurostar
Railway services introduced in 1981
Land speed records
Railteam
Rail transport brands
1981 establishments in France